Lake Zerendі (Zerendı) is a small lake in Zerendi District, Aqmola Region, Kazakhstan.  

Located just west of Zerendi village, the picturesque lake is a tourist attraction.

Geography
Lake Zerendi is located in the Kokshetau Hills, northern-central Kazakh Uplands. It is surrounded by small mountains covered with forest.

See also
Kokshetau National Park

References

Zerendi
Geography of Akmola Region
Kazakh Uplands